Matthew Dennis may refer to:
 Matthew Dennis (Australian footballer)
 Matthew Dennis (English footballer)
 Matt Dennis, American singer, pianist and composer